Frank Haynes may refer to:
 Frank Haynes (politician),  British politician
 Frank Haynes (musician), American jazz tenor saxophonist
 Frank Jay Haynes, American photographer, publisher, and entrepreneur